Eza or EZA may refer to:
 Ezaa language
 Èze, a commune in the Alpes-Maritimes department, France
 Eznis Airways, a defunct Mongolian airline

Eza, refers to the power of the universe or nature (reference to lord vishnu- Esa). Lord vishnu is considered as omni present and protector of all the matter in the universe.

Eza does not direct to any religious beliefs, rather it identifies the presence of the universal creator/ architect.